Before the Acts of Union 1707, the barons of the stewartry of Orkney and lordship of Shetland (formerly spelled Zetland) elected commissioners to represent them in the unicameral Parliament of Scotland and in the Convention of Estates. They were re-annexed to the Crown in 1669.

After 1708, Orkney and Shetland returned one member to the House of Commons of Great Britain and later to the House of Commons of the United Kingdom.

List of commissioners

 1661–62: Hugh Craigie of Gairsay (died c.1662)
 1663, 1669–74: Patrick Blair of Little Blair, sheriff  
 1665 convention: not represented
 1667 (convention): Arthur Buchanan of Sound  
 1667 (convention): William Douglas of Eglishaw   
 1678 (convention): Captain Andrew Dick
 1681–82, 1689 (convention), 1689–1701: William Craigie of Gairsay
 1685–86: Harie Grahame of Breckness 
 1685–86: Charles Murray of Hadden 
 1700: Charles Mitchell, writer in Edinburgh 
 1702, 1702–05: Sir Archibald Stewart of Burray
 1702-07: Alexander Douglas of Eglishay

References

See also
List of constituencies in the Parliament of Scotland at the time of the Union

Shires represented in the Parliament of Scotland (to 1707)
Constituencies disestablished in 1707
Politics of Orkney
Politics of Shetland
1707 disestablishments in Scotland
History of Orkney
History of Shetland